Back from the Grave, Volume 9, released on LP in 2015, is the ninth installment in the Back from the Grave series of garage rock compilations.  Like all the entries in the series it was assembled by Tim Warren of Crypt Records.  As indicated in the subheading which reads "Raw Blastin' Mid 60s Punk," this collection consists of many songs which display the rawer and more aggressive side of the genre and are often characterized by the use of fuzztone-distorted  guitars and rough vocals.  In typical fashion, the set generally excludes psychedelic, folk rock, and pop-influenced material in favor of basic primitive rock and roll.

The packaging contains well-researched liner notes written by Chris Bishop of Garage Hangover.com  which convey basic information about each song and group, such as origin, recording date, and biographical sketches, as well as photographs of the bands.  The album cover artwork features a highly satirical cartoon by Olaf Jens depicting noticeably gleeful revivified zombies who, on this occasion, have returned from "rock and roll heaven" on "retro" flying saucers and are targeting their customary victims: followers of supposedly "heretical" genres of music which have come to prominence over the years, which in this case include heavy metal, hardcore punk (insinuating that it is not true punk), rap, and modern pop-country—all done with a noticeable disdain for iPhones, music downloads, and other popular specimens of current technology and fashion (i.e. "exposed undies"), but are presented as "minor figures" in Jens' Sistine Chapel-like diorama depicting a global TNT-blasted apocalypse initiated as a result of the zombies' cleansing in their quest to permanently re-establish the reign of "true" rock & roll.
     
The album begins with the driving protopunk of "Circuit Breaker," by the Pastels, from Pasco, Washington.  The High Spirits from Saint Louis Park, Minnesota, follow with  a version of the Zombies' "It's Alright With Me," which at midpoint shifts from a slow tempo accelerating in cadence, then rising to an organ-drenched climax consummated by a bee-sting guitar solo accompanied by cathartic screams.  The Emeralds from Greenwood, Indiana are featured on the gritty blues-based "Like Father Like Son," which recounts a woeful tale partially based on A Tale of Two Cities, by Victorian novelist Charles Dickens, in which the character Jerry Cruncher is a porter by day and a grave robber at night, whose lyrics snidely remark: "...my son goes to the church where they wear the black capes where you're taught not to have your fun..."  Also included is the 1965 demo acetate version of "It's a Cry'n Shame" by The Gentlemen, from Dallas, Texas.  Knoll Allen And The Noble Savages are heard on the highly primitive sexually-charged "Animal."  "No Room For Your Love," by the Starfyres, closes out the set.

Track listing

Side one

The Pastels: "Circuit Breaker"    
The High Spirits: "It's Alright with Me"    
The Warlocks: "Beware"    
The Emeralds: "Like Father Like Son"    
The Why-Nots: "Tamborine"    
The Turncoats: "Something Better"    
The Classics: "I'm Hurtin'"

Side two
The Raevins: "The Edge of Time"    
Lord Charles & The Prophets: "Don't Ask Me no Questions"    
The Gentlemen, "It's a Cry'n Shame"    
The Shakles: "Whizz #7"    
Unknown Artist: "When I Feel Better"    
Knoll Allen and the Noble Savages: "Animal"    
The Donshires: "Sad and Blue"    
The Starfyres: "No Room for Your Love"

Catalogue and release information

LP (Crypt, 2015)

Back from the Grave, Volumes 9 and 10 (CD)

Back from the Grave, Volumes 9 and 10 (CD), is numerically, though not chronologically, the fifth installment in the series of Back from the Grave of garage rock compilations released on compact disk in 2015  which, unlike the previous set of CD releases issued between 1996 and 2000, which it will be replacing, attempts to faithfully replicate the contents of the Back from the Grave LPs, which will bring the series for the first time into multi-medium coherence.  Like all of the entries in the series it was assembled by Tim Warren of Crypt Records.  The CD is enclosed in a Digipack which, features a wraparound of the same cartoon by Olaf Jens that appears on the Volume 9 LP.  In the foldout of one of two the booklets enclosed is another satirical cartoon by Olaf Jens taken from the front cover of the Volume 10 LP.  The two booklets contain well-researched liner notes written by Chris Bishop of Garage Hangover.com  which convey basic information about each song and group, such as origin, recording date, and biographical sketches, as well as photographs of the bands.  Each booklet's information corresponds to the tracks on one of the LPs, the first for Volume 9 and the second for Volume 10.  The track list to the Volumes 9 and 10 CD is identical to the corresponding LPs.

Track listing

The Pastels: "Circuit Breaker"    
The High Spirits: "It's Alright with Me"    
The Warlocks: "Beware"    
The Emeralds: "Like Father Like Son"    
The Why-Nots: "Tamborine"    
The Turncoats: "Something Better"    
The Classics: "I'm Hurtin'"    
The Raevins: "The Edgge Of Time"    
Lord Charles & The Prophets: "Don't Ask Me No Questions"    
The Gentlemen: "It's a Cry'n Shame"    
The Shakles: "Whizz #7"    
Unknown Artist: "When I Feel Better"    
Knoll Allen and the Noble Savages: "Animal"    
The Donshires: "Sad and Blue"    
The Starfyres: "No Room for Your Love"    
James Bond and the Agents: "Wild Angel"    
John English III and the Heathens: "I Need You Near"    
The Four: "69"    
The Expressions: "Return to Innocence"    
The Orphans: "Without You"    
The Sires: "Don't Look Now"    
It's Them/TTHHEMM: "Baby (I Still Want Your Lovin')"    
The Orphans: "Hey Gyp"    
Nobodys Children: "Mother's Tin Moustache"    
South' Soul: "Lost"    
The Hotbeats: "Listen"    
The Hard Times: "Mr. Rolling Stone"    
Four More: "Problem Child"    
The Color: "Young Miss Larsen"    
GMC and the Arcelles: "The Witch"

Catalogue and release information

Compact disc (Crypt-114 CD, rel. 2015)

References

Back from the Grave (series)
2015 compilation albums